The 1973 Giro di Lombardia was the 67th edition of the Giro di Lombardia cycle race and was held on 13 October 1973. The race started in Milan and finished in Como. The race was won by Felice Gimondi of the Bianchi team.

General classification

Notes

References

1973
Giro di Lombardia
Giro di Lombardia
1973 Super Prestige Pernod